Grand-Métis is a municipality in the La Mitis Regional County Municipality within the Bas-Saint-Laurent region of Quebec, Canada. It is situated where the Mitis River meets the Saint Lawrence River, and was developed from 1818 by the pioneering John MacNider.

Etymology
The names "Métis" and "Mitis" are said to come from a Mi'kmaq word meaning "meeting place" or another referring to willow or poplar trees.

Demographics

Population

Attractions

The historic Reford Gardens (Jardins de Métis) are located nearby. These gardens, now maintained by Les Amis des Jardins de Métis, are the result of Elsie Reford's extraordinary passion for horticulture. An International Garden Festival is held here each summer. The garden's symbol, the Himalayan Blue Poppy (Meconopsis betonicifolia), can be found growing there in summer.  The gardens were designated a National Historic Site of Canada in 1995.

See also
 List of municipalities in Quebec

References

External links

Jardins de Métis/Reford Gardens
Les Jardins de Métis

Municipalities in Quebec
Incorporated places in Bas-Saint-Laurent